WMGT-TV (channel 41) is a television station in Macon, Georgia, United States, affiliated with NBC. It is the flagship television property of Savannah-based Morris Multimedia. WMGT-TV's studios are located on Poplar Street in downtown Macon, and its transmitter is located on SR 87/US 23/US 129 ALT (Golden Isles Highway) along the Bibb–Twiggs county line.

History
The station first signed on the air on September 30, 1968, as WCWB-TV. It was the first commercial television station to start up in the Macon market since CBS affiliate WMAZ-TV (channel 13) debuted on September 27, 1953, fifteen years and three days earlier. The station was founded by Dothan, Alabama broadcaster and perennial Alabama political candidate Charles Woods, who owned the station for about six years.

Channel 41 has been an NBC affiliate since its debut. however, unlike many stations in (then) two-station markets, WCWB did not assume a secondary affiliation with ABC. Instead, WMAZ aired select ABC shows during time periods when the station was not carrying CBS programming; Macon would not receive a full-time ABC affiliate of its own until WGXA (channel 24, now a Fox affiliate) signed on in April 1982. 

In 1974, Woods sold channel 41 to station president F. E. Busby, who headed a local investor group known as Bibb Television, Inc. Busby proved no more successful at making WCWB profitable than Woods had been, and current owner Morris Multimedia bought the station from Bibb four years later, in 1978.

Channel 41's early years of struggle were caused in large part because the Federal Communications Commission (FCC) had implemented the All-Channel Receiver Act only four years before the station signed on the air. Macon is a fairly large market geographically, and UHF stations are usually not received well across wide areas, even though much of Middle Georgia's terrain is fairly level. Many area households probably did not upgrade their sets to newer UHF-compatible models (or purchase expensive converters) until well into the early 1970s, meaning that, in WCWB's first years of operation, some viewers could not watch the station even had they wanted to, a situation greatly handicapping the young station's promotional efforts. Many (if not most) viewers in Middle Georgia did not get a clear picture from the station until cable arrived in the area in the late 1970s. Even so, most Middle Georgia viewers instinctively turned to WMAZ out of long-standing habits for years, ignoring WCWB even after UHF compatibility became universal on sets (the only other UHF station available then was WDCO-TV (now WMUM-TV), a satellite of Georgia Public Television).

Further complicating matters, WCWB had to compete with longer-established NBC affiliates in the VHF band that were easily viewable on the outer portions of the market. WSB-TV in Atlanta put out at least a grade B signal into much of the northern portion of the market, while WALB-TV in Albany and WSAV-TV in Savannah could be picked up in the respective portions of the southwestern and southeastern portions of WCWB's viewing area.

The station changed its call letters to WMGT (for "Middle Georgia Television") on December 1, 1983, to reflect the area of Georgia that it serves (the old WCWB call letters would later be used by channel 22 in Pittsburgh from 1998 to 2006 during its affiliation with The WB; that station is now WPNT). In 2000, the station moved its operations from unincorporated Bibb County into a renovated two-story warehouse in Downtown Macon, which promised to aid the revitalization of the historic area and signify future growth for the station. Morris maintains its corporate headquarters on the second floor of WMGT's studio facility. The station's legal call sign was modified in 2003 to include a "-TV" suffix to disambiguate itself from a Minnesota radio station that also held the WMGT calls. On April 3, 2006, WMGT retired its "41" logo (which resembled the 1993 to 2001 logo used by fellow NBC affiliate and former sister station KARK-TV in Little Rock) and "41 NBC" branding, introducing a new logo and rebranding as "Today's MGT"; the "41 NBC" brand was restored on March 23, 2009 with the introduction of a new logo.

1988 World Series intrusion

An unknown technician from WMGT was fired after the station was hijacked during a live broadcast of Game 1 of the 1988 World Series between the Oakland Athletics and the Los Angeles Dodgers, replacing 10 seconds of the second inning with a scene from a random pornographic film. A couple days afterwards, production manager L. A. Sturdivant told The Atlanta Constitution that the matter was under investigation, and stated that the incident had been an accident and not deliberately planned.

WMGT-DT2
WMGT-DT2, branded as Bounce TV Macon, is the primary Bounce TV and secondary MyNetworkTV-affiliated second digital subchannel of WMGT-TV, broadcasting in standard definition on channel 41.2.

The subchannel first signed on the air on July 6, 2009. Prior to its launch, MyNetworkTV programming was previously carried as a secondary affiliation on Fox affiliate WGXA (channel 24) beginning with the service's launch on September 5, 2006. In the summer of 2011, WMGT-DT2 was rebranded as "My41.2."

By March 2020, the Bounce TV programming once seen on Channel 41.3 was merged onto the schedule of WMGT-DT2, replacing the syndicated programming on the subchannel outside of the MyNetworkTV lineup; additionally, the latter's weeknight prime time programming was also moved to the graveyard slot in favor of Bounce TV's prime time offerings, an increasingly common fate for MyNetworkTV's schedule on a number of its affiliates.

Programming
Syndicated programs broadcast on WMGT include Inside Edition and Access Hollywood. WMGT is one of a few NBC affiliates to air paid programming on weekdays.

News operation

WMGT-TV presently broadcasts 20 hours of locally produced newscasts each week (with four hours each weekday and one hour on Sundays). Unlike most NBC affiliates, the station does not produce any live newscasts on Saturdays.

The station began producing newscasts at its 1968 inception. However, due to the problems mentioned above caused by WMAZ's dominance of the market, WCWB's newscasts struggled in the ratings for years, and were mostly discontinued by the early 1970s. It made a modest attempt at newscasts again later in the decade. However, within a few months following its start in 1982, WGXA's newscasts surged to second place in the market (behind WMAZ), because its news product was perceived as far more modern than that of the newscasts seen on WCWB. Once again, due to low viewership, channel 41 shut down its news department in 1992. For the next 12 years, it was one of the few Big Three affiliates that did not air any newscasts at all.

The station relaunched its news operation on September 6, 2004, as Tropical Storm Frances moved through the Southeastern United States. At that time, WMGT began producing three half-hour newscasts that aired at 6:30 a.m., 5:30 and 11:00 p.m. When the news department was re-established, WMGT was among the first stations in the country to maintain a completely digital newsgathering operation.

With cable now having leveled the playing field somewhat by rendering the UHF reception issue largely moot, WMGT gradually expanded its newscasts over the next few years. The station eventually expanded its weekday morning newscast to two hours, running from 5:00 to 7:00 a.m., in October 2012. The early evening newscast was later moved to 6:00 p.m. On July 6, 2009, the station began producing a half-hour prime time newscast each weeknight at 10:00 p.m. for WMGT-DT2, and also began airing a rebroadcast of its 6:00 p.m. newscast at 7:00 p.m. In October 2012, the station expanded its 11:00 p.m. newscast to Sunday evenings. Around this time, the station began airing a rebroadcast of its morning newscast on WMGT-DT2 from 7:00 to 9:00 a.m. On September 16, 2013, the station debuted a half-hour midday newscast at 11 a.m. called 41 Today, a non-traditional news program that places a heavy emphasis on community events, consumer and lifestyle features and weather forecasts. On February 18, 2014, WMGT became the third station in the Macon market (after WRWR-LD (channel 38) and WMAZ-TV) to begin broadcasting its local newscasts in high definition; however, the newscasts on WMGT-DT2 were not included in the upgrade, instead broadcasting them in widescreen enhanced definition in the subchannel's native 480p resolution format.

Notable current on-air staff
 Bill Shanks – Host of The End Zone

Technical information

Subchannels
The station's digital signal is multiplexed:

WMGT has been digital-only since February 17, 2009.

On July 6, 2009, the station began carrying MyNetworkTV on a new second digital subchannel. The programming service had previously been carried in the Macon market as a secondary affiliation on Fox affiliate WGXA beginning with MyNetworkTV's launch on September 5, 2006.

On July 2, 2015, Bounce TV was moved from WPGA-TV to WMGT-DT3, while ThisTV network took its place on WPGA-DT3 which was previously on WPGA-LP channel 50.

In mid-March 2016, WMGT-TV began carrying Escape (now Ion Mystery) on digital subchannel 41.4.

In mid-October 2016, WMGT-TV began carrying Laff on digital subchannel 41.5.

On July 1, 2021, WMGT-TV added the Defy TV network on channel 41.3 (previously occupied by Bounce TV)

References

External links

MGT-TV
NBC network affiliates
Bounce TV affiliates
MyNetworkTV affiliates
Defy TV affiliates
Ion Mystery affiliates
Laff (TV network) affiliates
TrueReal affiliates
Morris Multimedia
Television channels and stations established in 1968
1968 establishments in Georgia (U.S. state)